Dichogama prognealis is a moth in the family Crambidae. It was described by Druce in 1895. It is found in Costa Rica and Ecuador.

The forewings are pearly-white with a large yellow patch at the anal angle. There is a series of four glossy bluish-black bands extending across the wing from the costal margin as far as the yellow colour, and there is a small round black spot at the anal angle. The inner margin is edged with black near the base. The hindwings are pale yellowish-white.

References

Moths described in 1895
Dichogamini